Johanna Maria Baltensperger Rasmussen (born 2 July 1983) is a former Danish professional footballer who last played for Linköpings FC in the Damallsvenskan and the Denmark women's national football team. She played as a forward and wore the number 13 shirt for Denmark.

Club career
In February 2002 Rasmussen was reported to be joining Texas Tech University on a soccer scholarship. Instead she moved to Fortuna Hjørring in summer 2002.

Rasmussen represented Fortuna Hjørring in both legs of the 2003 UEFA Women's Cup Final, a 1–7 aggregate defeat to Umeå IK of Sweden. After 125 appearances for Fortuna, Rasmussen signed a contract with Umeå IK ahead of the Swedish 2008 season.

In 2010 Rasmussen followed Umeå teammates Ramona Bachmann and Mami Yamaguchi to the American Women's Professional Soccer (WPS) league, playing the 2010 season with Atlanta Beat who finished last. She began the following campaign with magicJack, but after scoring once in eight appearances negotiated a release from her contract to return to Europe.

She signed with Kristianstads DFF in August 2011. Rasmussen moved to league champions Linköpings FC ahead of the 2017 season, but suffered a serious knee injury shortly afterwards.

International career

Rasmussen made her senior international debut in October 2002, in a 2–0 defeat to Germany in Ulm. She went on to play at UEFA Women's Euro 2005 in North West England, the 2007 FIFA Women's World Cup in China and UEFA Women's Euro 2009 in Finland. Rasmussen won her 100th cap for Denmark in March 2013.

She was named in national coach Kenneth Heiner-Møller's Denmark squad for UEFA Women's Euro 2013. In Denmark's opening group match against hosts Sweden Rasmussen featured in an eventful 1–1 draw.

Personal life
Rasmussen was a childhood chess champion.

References

External links

 
 
 Denmark player profile at DBU 
 
 

1983 births
Living people
Danish women's footballers
Fortuna Hjørring players
Danish expatriate men's footballers
Expatriate women's soccer players in the United States
Denmark women's international footballers
Atlanta Beat (WPS) players
MagicJack (WPS) players
FIFA Century Club
Kristianstads DFF players
Linköpings FC players
Damallsvenskan players
Umeå IK players
Danish expatriate sportspeople in Sweden
Expatriate women's footballers in Sweden
2007 FIFA Women's World Cup players
Women's association football wingers
Women's association football forwards
People from Guldborgsund Municipality
Women's Professional Soccer players
Sportspeople from Region Zealand